Dávid Hegedűs (born 6 June 1985) is a Hungarian football player who plays for Eger.

Club statistics

Updated to games played as of 17 June 2020.

References
Player profile at HLSZ 

1985 births
Sportspeople from Eger
Living people
Hungarian footballers
Association football defenders
Marcali VFC footballers
Jászapáti VSE footballers
Bőcs KSC footballers
Kazincbarcikai SC footballers
Egri FC players
Szolnoki MÁV FC footballers
Kaposvári Rákóczi FC players
Mezőkövesdi SE footballers
Nemzeti Bajnokság I players
Nemzeti Bajnokság II players
Nemzeti Bajnokság III players
21st-century Hungarian people